Sami Pajari (born 1 December 2001) is a Finnish rally driver. He won the Junior World Rally Championship in 2021. Pajari most recently competed in the 2022 World Rally Championship-3.

Results

WRC results 

* Season still in progress.

WRC-2 results

WRC-3 results

JWRC results

References

External links
 Rally results profile

2001 births
Living people
Sportspeople from Lahti
Finnish rally drivers
World Rally Championship drivers
Place of birth missing (living people)
21st-century Finnish people

Toksport WRT drivers